Pope John XXIII Central Catholic High School, located in Elgin, Nebraska, United States, is a Catholic high school established in the fall of 1967.  It was named in honor of Pope John XXIII, the 261st pope of the Catholic Church. It is located in the Archdiocese of Omaha.

History 
On May 6, 1966, six parishes from the area came together to discuss the building of a central Catholic high school.  The parishes decided on a design of a  building which would hold up to 350 students in a one-level loop corridor.

The current superintendent is Lisa Schumacher. The school currently teaches approximately 115 students in grades 7–12.

Activities 

Pope John's school colors are blue and white; its athletic teams are the Crusaders. The school  takes part in the D-1 activities in the Nebraska School Activities Association.

The school's track and field team has had a few students qualify for state championships in recent years, and the girls' basketball team made it to state in 2006.  In 2008, the girls' basketball team made it to the state championship game and ended up winning state runner-up.  The boys' basketball team made it to state for the first time in 2007.  In November 2007, the football team won the school's first state championship.   The wrestling team has produced 17 state champions in Class C and Class D, and has finished in the top three in team, scoring twice (in 1983 and 1994).

References

External links 
 
 History
 Enrollment

Catholic secondary schools in Nebraska
Private middle schools in Nebraska
Roman Catholic Archdiocese of Omaha
Educational institutions established in 1967
Schools in Antelope County, Nebraska